The Scottish Government is the devolved government of Scotland. It was formed in 1999 as the Scottish Executive following the 1997 referendum on Scottish devolution.

The Scottish Government consists of the Scottish Ministers, which is used to describe their collective legal functions. The Scottish Government is accountable to the Scottish Parliament, which was also created by the Scotland Act 1998 with the first minister appointed by the monarch following a proposal by the Parliament. The responsibilities of the Scottish Parliament fall over matters that are not reserved in law to the Parliament of the United Kingdom.

Ministers are appointed by the first minister with the approval of the Scottish Parliament and the monarch from among the members of the Parliament. The Scotland Act 1998 makes provision for ministers and junior ministers, referred to by the current administration as Cabinet secretaries and ministers, in addition to two law officers: the lord advocate and the solicitor general for Scotland. Collectively the Scottish Ministers and the Civil Service staff that support the Scottish Government are formally referred to as the Scottish Administration.

History

In 1885, many domestic policy functions relating to Scotland were brought into the responsibility of the Scottish Office, a department of the Government of the United Kingdom which was headed by a Secretary for Scotland, later the Secretary of State for Scotland.

Following the 1997 referendum on devolution, many of the functions of the Secretary of State for Scotland were transferred to the Scottish Ministers, accountable to a devolved Scottish Parliament.

The first Scottish Executive was formed by First Minister Donald Dewar as a coalition between the Scottish Labour Party and the Scottish Liberal Democrats. During this period, ministerial appointees were divided into ministers and deputy ministers. The Labour-Liberal Democrat coalition continued under subsequent First Ministers Henry McLeish and Jack McConnell. Following the 2007 Scottish Parliament election, Alex Salmond headed a Scottish National Party administration until his resignation in 2014 and the appointment of his former Deputy First Minister Nicola Sturgeon.

Since 2007, the Scottish Executive has used the name Scottish Government. The change of name was later recognised in law by the Scotland Act 2012. In 2001, former First Minister Henry McLeish had proposed such a change, but experienced some opposition.

At the same time that the Scottish Government began to use its new name, a new emblem was adopted. It replaced the use of a version of the Royal Arms with the Flag of Scotland.

The Scottish Ministers

The Scottish Government is led by the First Minister of Scotland and consists of additional Scottish Ministers and the law officers.

The Scottish Parliament nominates one of its members to be appointed as First Minister by the King. The First Minister appoints additional Ministers to a variety of ministerial portfolios. More senior ministers, known as Cabinet Secretaries, collectively form a cabinet with the First Minister. The Scottish law officers, the Lord Advocate and Solicitor, can be appointed without being a member of the Scottish Parliament, however, they are subject to the Parliament's approval and scrutiny. Law officers are also appointed by the King on the recommendation of the first minister.

Cabinet
The Scottish Cabinet collectively takes responsibility for policy coordination within the Scottish Government. It is supported by the Cabinet Secretariat, based at St Andrew's House. While the Scottish Parliament is in session, Cabinet meets weekly. Normally meetings are held on Tuesday afternoons in Bute House, the official residence of the First Minister. Members of the Scottish Cabinet receive blue despatch boxes for their use while in office.

There are currently two sub-committees of cabinet:

 Cabinet Sub-Committee on Legislation
 Scottish Government Resilience Room (SGoRR) Cabinet Sub-Committee

The current members of the Scottish Government's Cabinet are:

Junior Scottish Ministers
Junior Scottish Ministers, who take the title of Minister, are also appointed to the Scottish Government. Each junior minister has oversight by a particular Cabinet Secretary.

The current Junior Scottish Ministers are:

The Law Officers
The current law officers are:

Responsibilities
The responsibilities of the Scottish Ministers broadly follow those of the Scottish Parliament provided for in the Scotland Act 1998 and subsequent UK legislation. Where pre-devolution legislation of the UK Parliament provided that certain functions could be performed by UK Government ministers, these functions were transferred to the Scottish Ministers if they were within the legislative competence of the Scottish Parliament.

Functions which were devolved under the Scotland Act 1998 included:
Healthcare
Education
Justice
Most aspects of transport
Environment
Policing
Rural Affairs
Housing

Subsequently, the Scotland Acts of 2012 and 2016 transferred powers over:
Some taxation powers – full control of Income Tax on income earned through employment, Land and Buildings Transaction Tax, Landfill Tax
Drink driving limits 
Scottish Parliament and local authority elections
Some social security powers
Crown Estate of Scotland

The 1998 Act also provided for orders to be made allowing Scottish Ministers to exercise powers of UK Government ministers in areas that remain reserved to the Parliament of the United Kingdom. Equally the Act allows for the Scottish Ministers to transfer functions to the UK Government ministers, or for particular "agency arrangements". This executive devolution means that the powers of the Scottish Ministers and the Scottish Parliament are not identical.

The most prominent reserved matters that remain under the exclusive control of the Parliament of the United Kingdom are:
The Constitution – Acts of Union, The Crown, Devolution Settlement
Foreign Policy
National Security and Defence
Economic policy
Immigration and Nationality
Trade and industry
Energy
Most aspects of Social Security
Civil Service
Consumer rights
International Development
Copyright
Telecommunications and Postal services
Broadcasting
Reserved taxes
Currency
Pensions

The members of the government have substantial influence over legislation in Scotland, putting forward the majority of bills that are successful in becoming Acts of the Scottish Parliament.

The Scottish Government introduced a National Performance Framework (NPF) in 2007. This framework measures "how Scotland is doing" in eleven National Outcome areas including health, poverty, environment and education, along with offering a portrait of "the kind of Scotland" that government wishes to create. Each of the National Outcomes is measured by a number of Indicators and associated data sets. The National Outcomes are that people:
grow up loved, safe and respected so that they realise their full potential
live in communities that are inclusive, empowered, resilient and safe
are creative and their vibrant and diverse cultures are expressed and enjoyed widely
have a globally competitive, entrepreneurial, inclusive and sustainable economy
are well educated, skilled and able to contribute to society
value, enjoy, protect and enhance their environment
have thriving and innovative businesses, with quality jobs and fair work for everyone
are healthy and active
respect, protect and fulfil human rights and live free from discrimination
are open, connected and make a positive contribution internationally
tackle poverty by sharing opportunities, wealth and power more equally.

The Scottish Government 

In addition to the Scottish Ministers, the Scottish Government is supported by a number of officials drawn from the UK Civil Service. They are collectively referred to as the Scottish Administration in the Scotland Act 1998. According to 2012 reports, there are 16,000 civil servants working in core Scottish Government directorates and agencies.

The civil service is a matter reserved to the British parliament at Westminster (rather than devolved to Holyrood): Scottish Government civil servants work within the rules and customs of His Majesty's Civil Service, but serve the devolved administration rather than British government.

Permanent Secretary

The Permanent Secretary is the Scottish Government's most senior civil servant. They lead the administration's strategic board as well as directly support the First Minister and cabinet and is the accountable officer with responsibility to ensure that the government's money and resources are used effectively and properly. The current permanent secretary is John-Paul Marks, who succeeded Leslie Evans in January 2022.

The Permanent Secretary is a member of the UK Civil Service, and therefore takes part in the UK-wide Permanent Secretaries Management Group under the Cabinet Secretary who performs a number of similar functions in relation to the UK Government. The Scottish Government's Permanent Secretary is responsible to the Scottish Ministers in terms of policy.

Directorates

The Scottish Government is divided into 49 directorates which execute government policy in specified areas. Unlike in the British government, senior ministers do not lead government departments and have no direct role in the operation of the directorates.

The directorates are grouped together into seven "Directorates General", each run by a senior civil servant who is titled a "Director-General". As of May 2021, there are seven Directorates General:

Communities Directorates
Constitution and External Affairs Directorates
Corporate Directorates
Economy Directorates
Education and Justice Directorates
Health and Social Care Directorates
Scottish Exchequer Directorates

Supporting these directorates are a variety of other corporate service teams and professional groups.

The Crown Office and Procurator Fiscal Service serves as an independent prosecution service in Scotland, and is a ministerial department of the Scottish Government. It is headed by the Lord Advocate, who is responsible for prosecution, along with the procurators fiscal, under Scots law.

Strategic Board
The strategic board is composed of the permanent secretary, the seven directors-general, two chief advisers (scientific and economic) and four non-executive directors. The board is responsible for providing support to the government through the permanent secretary, and is the executive of the Scottish civil service.

Executive Agencies

To deliver its work, there are 9 executive agencies established by ministers as part of government departments, or as departments in their own right, to carry out a discrete area of work. These include, for example, the Scottish Prison Service and Transport Scotland. Executive agencies are staffed by civil servants.

There are two non-ministerial departments that form part of the Scottish administration, and therefore the devolved administration, but answer directly to the Scottish Parliament rather than to ministers: these are the General Register Office for Scotland and the Office of the Scottish Charity Regulator.

Public Bodies

The Scottish Government is also responsible for a large number of non-departmental public bodies. These include executive NDPBs (e.g. Scottish Enterprise); advisory NDPBs (e.g. the Scottish Law Commission); tribunals (e.g. the Children's Panel and Additional Support Needs Tribunals for Scotland); and nationalised industries (e.g. Scottish Water). These are staffed by public servants, rather than civil servants.

The Scottish Government is also responsible for some other public bodies that are not classed as non-departmental public bodies, such as NHS Boards, Visiting Committees for Scottish Penal Establishments or HM Chief Inspector of Constabulary for Scotland.

Offices 
The headquarters building of the Scottish Government is St Andrew's House, which is located on Calton Hill in Edinburgh. Some other government directorates are based at Victoria Quay and Saughton House in Edinburgh, and Atlantic Quay in Glasgow. The head offices of the Crown Office and Procurator Fiscal Service and the Lord Advocate's Chambers are at Chambers Street in central Edinburgh.

There are numerous other Edinburgh properties occupied by the Scottish Government. Both the Scottish Fiscal Commission and the Scottish Human Rights Commission are based in the old Governor's House on the site of the former Calton Gaol, next door to St. Andrew's House on Regent Road. Other offices are scattered around central Edinburgh, including Bute House on Charlotte Square, the official residence of the first minister.

All Ministers and officials have access to Scotland House at Victoria Embankment in London, when necessary. Dover House on Whitehall is now used by the Scotland Office and the devolved Scottish Ministers no longer use it.

The Scottish Government also operates local offices and specialist facilities around Scotland, for example those used by Rural Payments & Services and Marine Scotland.

International offices

The Scottish Government has a European Union representative office, located at Rond-Point Robert Schuman in Brussels, Belgium, which forms a part of the United Kingdom Permanent Representation to the European Union. The Scottish Government also maintains offices within the British Embassy in Washington, D.C., as well as the British Embassy in Berlin and has accredited representatives within the British Embassy in Beijing.

See also 

 Joint Ministerial Committee
 Local income tax
 Council of Economic Advisers (Scotland)
 Scottish Broadcasting Commission
 Scottish Social Attitudes Survey
 2014 Scottish independence referendum
 Scotland Act 2016
 History of Scottish devolution
 Welsh Government
 United Kingdom withdrawal from the European Union
 Government spending in the United Kingdom
 Revenue Scotland

References

External links 
 

 
Political office-holders in Scotland
1999 establishments in Scotland
2000s in Scotland
2010s in Scotland
Government of the United Kingdom by country
Scottish devolution
Lists of government ministers of Scotland
Organisations based in Edinburgh
Scottish Parliament